Allan Agar (born 11 June 1949) is an English former professional rugby league footballer who played in the 1970s and 1980s, and coached in the 1980s and 1990s.

Background
Allan Agar was born in Pontefract, West Riding of Yorkshire, England, he was a pupil at Normanton Grammar School alongside fellow rugby league footballers; Mick Morgan and Stuart Carlton, and he is  the father of the rugby league footballer, and coach; Richard Agar.

Honours

Man of Steel Award:1983

Challenge Cup Winner 1979/80, 1982/83

Championship Winner 1972/73, 1978/79

BBC2 Floodlit Trophy Winner 1977/78

Playing career
Allan Agar played  in the 10–5 victory over Hull F.C. in 1979–80 Challenge Cup Final during the 1979–80 season at Wembley Stadium, London on Saturday 3 May 1980, in front of a crowd of 95,000.

He played  in Dewsbury's 9–36 defeat by Leeds in the 1972–73 Yorkshire County Cup Final during the 1972–73 season at Odsal Stadium, Bradford on Saturday 7 October 1972, in front of a crowd of 7,806.

He played  in Dewsbury's 22–13 victory over Leeds in the Championship Final during the 1972–73 season at Odsal Stadium, Bradford on Saturday 19 May 1973.

He played in Hull Kingston Rovers' Championship winning squad during the 1978–79 season

He played  in the 13-3 defeat by Hull F.C. in the 1979 BBC2 Floodlit Trophy Final during the 1979–80 season at The Boulevard, Hull on Tuesday 18 December 1979, in front of a crowd of 18,500

He was an unused interchange/substitute, i.e. number 14, in Hull Kingston Rovers' 26-11 victory over St. Helens in the 1977 BBC2 Floodlit Trophy Final during the 1977-78 season at Craven Park, Hull on Tuesday 13 December 1977.

Coaching career
Agar became coach of Featherstone Rovers, and in his first season took them to a 14–12 victory over Hull F.C. in the 1982–83 Challenge Cup Final. He then went on to win the Man of Steel in 1983. He later coached Rochdale Hornets from July 1989 until January 1991, and was the coach in Rochdale Hornets' 14–24 defeat by St. Helens in the 1991–92 Lancashire County Cup Final during the 1991–92 season at Wilderspool Stadium, Warrington on Sunday 20 October 1991, in front of a crowd of 9,269. Agar was later appointed Chief executive officer of the Featherstone Rovers.

References

External links
Richard Agar: Eager for a new challenge as battered Hull seek salvation in cup
Cup heroes: Roger Millward

1949 births
Living people
Bramley R.L.F.C. coaches
Carlisle RLFC coaches
Carlisle RLFC players
Dewsbury Rams players
English rugby league coaches
English rugby league players
Featherstone Rovers coaches
Featherstone Rovers players
Hull Kingston Rovers players
Hunslet R.L.F.C. players
Rochdale Hornets coaches
Rugby league five-eighths
Rugby league halfbacks
Rugby league players from Pontefract
Wakefield Trinity players